Linoleum were a London-based indie–alternative musical group formed in 1994.

History
Caroline Finch and Paul Jones first met in 1991, and began writing songs together. Finch (vocals, guitar) and Jones (guitar) were joined in 1994 by Dave Nice (drums), and in 1995 by Emma Tornaro (bass guitar), and the band signed a management deal with CMO at the end of 1995. The band set up their own Lino Vinyl label and all releases were on this label between 1996 and 1997. The first singles, "Dissent" and "Smear", came in sleeves made from linoleum.

The band's debut album, Dissent, was released in 1997 on Lino Vinyl, and was released in the United States by Geffen Records. Dissent was recorded at Fort Apache Studios in Cambridge, Massachusetts with Paul Kolderie and Sean Slade producing, whose previous efforts included projects with Radiohead, Hole and the Pixies among others. It received a mixed reaction and failed to make the breakthrough hoped for, leading to a change of label with Fierce Panda releasing later singles and second album The Race from the Burning Building (2000). Jones left in 2000 to join Elastica; He was replaced by Gavin Pearce.

Linoleum played their last gig at the Union Chapel, Islington in 2001.

After Elastica split in 2001 Paul Jones went on to work in A&R for and formed Slogan Records, releasing his favourite band The Fall's Fall Heads Roll album to critical acclaim in 2005. In 2006 he sat on the judging panel for an X-Factor type competition run by MySpace shown on Channel 4.

He is currently the head of A&R at Rough Trade Records.
as well as managing the bands Black Midi and Shame with RT management 

In 2002 Caroline Finch composed the score for the short British film Rosie by Lauren Pushkin.

The current status of the band in unknown, although since 2000 Caroline Finch has been involved in the composition of soundtracks for various films.

Dave Nice has played live a number of times with singer-songwriter Sid Stronach, playing guitar and bass as well as the drums. He is a member of Oblong, and plays on the album Indicator (Expanding Records, 2006). He also plays guitar and provides some backing vocals on the Under Cambrian Sky album by Aberystwyth-based band The Lowland Hundred.

In 2010 the KEELERTORNERO gallery opened online featuring works by Emma Tornero who it appears is now working as an artist.

Since 2003, Caroline Finch has practised as a sound artist / composer under the name Caroline Devine. Devine's work, Recording Contract Recordings is a 14 channel sound installation that appropriates a Linoleum recording contract, presenting it in the form of a vinyl disc.

Caroline Devine was shortlisted for a BASCA British Composer Award in the Sonic Arts Category in 2013 and 2014 and for an Ivor Novello award in the Sound Arts category of The Ivors Composer Awards 2020.

Musical style
The band have variously been compared with Elastica, Sonic Youth, The Pretenders, PJ Harvey and the Pixies. New Wave and post-punk bands of the late 1970s and early 1980s have also been identified as an influence, and on the band's second album they covered The Passions' "I'm in Love with a German Film Star".

Discography

Singles
"Dissent" (1996), Lino Vinyl  UK No. 171  	
"Smear" (1996), Lino Vinyl  UK No. 129
"On a Tuesday" (1997) Lino Vinyl UK No. 83
"Marquis" (1997) Lino Vinyl - UK No. 73
"Your Back Again" (1999), Fierce Panda - split single with Sing-Sing
"I'm in Love with a German Film Star" (2000), Fierce Panda

Albums
Dissent (1997), Lino Vinyl
Track listing:
"Restriction"
"Marquis"
"Dissent"
"Stay Awhile"
"On a Tuesday"
"Dangerous Shoes"
"Ray Liotta"
"She's Sick"
"Twisted"
"Beds"
"Unresolved"
"Ways to Escape"
"Ether"
"On a Tuesday" (French version)
 
The Race from the Burning Building (2000), Fierce Panda
Track listing: 
"Your Back Again"
"Black Dress"
"Don't Come Down"
"Sirens"
"29"
"I'm in Love with a German Film Star"
"Libertine"
"Sing to Me"
"Til Daylight Found Them"
"This Scene"
"FIN"

References

External links 
 Linovinyl - Official Site
 Dangerous Shoes - Fansite
 Linovinyl - YouTube
 Caroline Devine Ivor Novello Awards
 Caroline Devine - Recording Contract Recordings

British indie rock groups
Fierce Panda Records artists